Aheloy Nunatak is a rocky 390m peak in the  upper Huron Glacier in Livingston Island.  The peak forms the northeast extremity of a minor ridge which also features Erma Knoll and Lozen Nunatak, and is linked to Zograf Peak by Lozen Saddle.  The peak was first visited on 31 December 2004 by the Bulgarian Lyubomir Ivanov from Camp Academia, and was mapped in the Bulgarian Tangra 2004/05 topographic survey.  The peak was named after the Black Sea town of Aheloy, Bulgaria.

Location

See also
 Tangra 2004/05
 Tangra Mountains
 Livingston Island
 List of Bulgarian toponyms in Antarctica
 Antarctic Place-names Commission

Maps
 L.L. Ivanov et al. Antarctica: Livingston Island and Greenwich Island, South Shetland Islands. Scale 1:100000 topographic map. Sofia: Antarctic Place-names Commission of Bulgaria, 2005.
 L.L. Ivanov. Antarctica: Livingston Island and Greenwich, Robert, Snow and Smith Islands. Scale 1:120000 topographic map.  Troyan: Manfred Wörner Foundation, 2009.

References
 Aheloy Nunatak. SCAR Composite Gazetteer of Antarctica
 Bulgarian Antarctic Gazetteer. Antarctic Place-names Commission. (details in Bulgarian, basic data in English)

External links
 Aheloy Nunatak. Copernix satellite image

Tangra Mountains